Mīrdāmād or Mīr Dāmād may refer to the following:

Mir Damad, an Iranian scholar in the early 17th century
Mirdamad Boulevard, a boulevard in Tehran, named after Mir Damad